The 2015 NA LCS season was the third year of the North American League of Legends Championship Series. It saw an expansion of the league from eight to ten teams, as well as the introduction of championship points and the regional finals gauntlet to better determine which teams should qualify for the World Championship. The season was divided into spring and summer splits, each consisting of a regular season and playoff stage. The top six teams from the regular season advanced to the playoff stage, with the top two teams receiving a bye to the semifinals. Regular season games and the spring playoffs were played in the Riot Games Studios in Los Angeles, California, while the summer finals were held at Madison Square Garden.

The spring split began on January 24 and concluded with Team SoloMid winning their third NA LCS title on April 19, with a roster consisting of Dyrus, Santorin, Bjergsen, WildTurtle and Lustboy.

The summer split began on May 30 and concluded with Counter Logic Gaming winning their first NA LCS title on August 23, with a roster consisting of ZionSpartan, Xmithie, Pobelter, Huhi, Doublelift and Aphromoo.

The three teams that qualified for the 2015 World Championship were Counter Logic Gaming, Team SoloMid, and Cloud9.

Spring

Regular season

Playoffs

Summer

Regular season

Playoffs

Regional finals

References 

League of Legends Championship Series seasons
North American League of Legends Championship
North American League of Legends Championship
North American League of Legends Championship